Proprioseiopsis eurynotus is a species of mite in the family Phytoseiidae.

References

eurynotus
Articles created by Qbugbot
Animals described in 1968